Davydova is a surname. Notable people with the surname include:

Alla Davydova (born 1966), Russian hammer thrower
Anastasia Davydova (born 1983), Russian competitor in synchronized swimming and four-time Olympic champion
Ekaterina Davydova, Russian ice dancer
Lydia Davydova (born 1932), Russian soprano and a chamber music performer
Natalya Davydova (born 1985), Ukrainian weightlifter
Yelena Davydova (born 1961), Russian (formerly, Soviet) gymnast